Teuchitlán is a town and municipality, in Jalisco in central-western Mexico. The municipality covers an area of 285.53 km².

As of 2005, the municipality had a total population of 8,361.

Teuchitlan is located near the archeological site of Los Guachimontones, associated with the pre-Columbian Teuchitlán culture.

References

Municipalities of Jalisco